Robert "Bootsie" Barnes (November 27, 1937 – April 22, 2020) was an American jazz tenor saxophonist from Philadelphia.

Early life and education 
Barnes was raised in a housing project in North Philadelphia. His father was a trumpet player who performed with Bill Doggett and Frank Fairfax. His mother worked as a housekeeper. Barnes had three older brothers. His uncle, Jimmy Hamilton, was a jazz clarinetist and saxophonist. Barns initially intended to become a drummer after being given a pair of drumsticks by Sonny Greer during a visit to the Earle Theatre. He played drums at Benjamin Franklin High School before switching to saxophone.

Career
In the 1950s, Barnes played with various musicians in Philadelphia, including Lee Morgan, Philly Joe Jones and Bill Cosby (then a drummer).

During the 1960s, he performed with various organists including Jimmy Smith and Don Patterson, with whom he recorded in 1978. In the 1980s, he toured with Sonny Stitt. He continued to play in his home town and recorded his album "You Leave Me Breathless!" in 1995.

In an article for Patch, Kim Tucker wrote, "Barnes has toured the world performing the music he loves, jazz in places like St. Croix US Virgin Islands, to Europe and back home to Philadelphia. From the "Chitlin Circuit" to the infamous New Jersey clubs: Dreamland, Cotton Club, Loretta's High Hat, Club Harlem. Barnes has taken the stage at Philly's Blue Note, Just Jazz, Red Carpet, The Showboat and Pep's too."

Personal life 
Barnes died from COVID-19 in Wynnewood, Pennsylvania, on April 22, 2020, during the COVID-19 pandemic. He was 82.

Discography

As a leader
Been Here All Along – Bootsie Barnes Quartet (Way After Midnight, 1984)
You Leave Me Breathless – Bootsie Barnes Quartet (French Riviera, 2001)
Hello - Bootsie Barnes Quartet (French Riviera, 2003) 
Boppin' Round the Center – Bootsie Barnes Quintet (Harvest, 2004)
The More I See You – Bootsie Barnes & Larry McKenna (Cellar Live, 2018)

As a sideman
Looking Up - Cullen Knight (Tree Top, 1978)
Why Not... - Don Patterson (Muse, 1978)
Here to Create Music - Gamble/Huff (Philadelphia International, 1980)
The Saxophone Shop - The Odean Pope Saxophone Choir (Soul Note, 1985)
John Swana Quintet - Introducing John Swana (Criss Cross, 1991)
Epitome - Odean Pope Saxophone Choir (Soul Note, 1993)
Comin' Home - Poppa John DeFrancesco (Muse, 1994)
All in the Family - Poppa John & Joey DeFrancesco (Muse, 1998)
Live at Ortlieb's Jazzhaus  - Various Artists (Encounter, 2000)
Hip Cake Walk - Poppa John & Joey DeFrancesco (HighNote, 2001)
Philly Gumbo - John Swana (Criss Cross, 2001)
Open the Gates - Kenny Gates (Independent, 2003)
To Joe With Love - Juanita Holliday (Rhombus, 2003)
Shelf-Life - Uri Caine (Winter & Winter, 2005)
Philly Gumbo, Vol.2 - John Swana and The Philadelphians (Criss Cross, 2005)
I Got Up! - Chad Carter (Jkbj, 2009)

References

External links
 - Bootsie Barnes website
 

1937 births
2020 deaths
Musicians from Philadelphia
American jazz saxophonists
American male saxophonists
21st-century American saxophonists
Jazz musicians from Pennsylvania
21st-century American male musicians
American male jazz musicians
Deaths from the COVID-19 pandemic in Pennsylvania